Simon William Lucas, 3rd Baron Lucas of Chilworth b  6 February 1957) is a British peer.

Lucas was the eldest son of Michael William George Lucas, 2nd Baron Lucas of Chilworth. He was educated at Churcher's College, the University of Leicester and the Royal Military Academy Sandhurst after which he served with the Royal Engineers.

References

1957 births
Living people
Barons in the Peerage of the United Kingdom
Royal Engineers officers
Alumni of the University of Leicester
Graduates of the Royal Military Academy Sandhurst
People educated at Churcher's College